Andrei Kolosov (born June 8, 1989) is a Belarusian professional ice hockey player for HK Gomel of the Belarusian Extraleague. He competed in the 2012 IIHF World Championship as a member of the Belarus men's national ice hockey team.

References

External links

1989 births
Living people
Belarusian ice hockey forwards
Universiade medalists in ice hockey
Universiade silver medalists for Belarus
Competitors at the 2011 Winter Universiade